The 2007–08 Tampa Bay Lightning season began October 4, 2007. It is the Lightning's 16th season in the National Hockey League (NHL).

The Lightning introduced a new logo design prior to the start of the season. The new, "modernized" logo was similar to the team's original logo, with the edges on the lightning bolt, and the text looking "sharper." The wordmark "Lightning" has been dropped from the logo. It was the first change to the team's primary logo in its 15-year history and coincided with the launch of the Rbk Edge jersey design, introduced League wide.

The Lighting also announced that the team, along with the St. Pete Times Forum, had been tentatively sold to a group represented by former Columbus coach and general manager Doug MacLean. The deal was terminated in mid-November after the group, called Absolute Hockey Enterprises, began to fight amongst itself, leading to lawsuits being filed. The team, in announcing the cancellation of the sale, expressed in a November 27 release that it hoped the deal could be resurrected.

Forwards Vincent Lecavalier and Martin St. Louis were selected to represent the Lightning, and the Eastern Conference, at the 2008 All-Star Game in Atlanta. For the first time since the 2001–02 season, the Tampa Bay Lightning missed the Stanley Cup playoffs.

Regular season
The Lightning had the fewest power-play opportunities of all 30 teams (296) and, excluding one shootout goal allowed, gave up 266 goals during the regular season, tied with the Atlanta Thrashers for 30th overall.

Divisional standings

Conference standings

Game log

October
Record: 5–5–1; home: 5–0–1; road: 0–5–0.

November
Record: 5–8–1; home: 3–3–0; road: 2–5–1.

December
Record: 5–8–1; home: 4–5–1; road: 1–3–0.

January
Record: 6–5–2; home: 2–4–0; road: 4–1–2.

February
Record: 5–5–2; home: 2–4–0; road: 3–1–2.

March
Record: 5–8–2; home: 4–2–1; road: 1–6–1.

April
Record: 0–3–0; home: 0–0–0; road: 0–3–0.

Playoffs
The Lightning failed to qualify for the playoffs for the first time since the 2001–02 season, snapping their four season playoff streak.

Player stats

Skaters

Note: GP = Games played; G = Goals; A = Assists; Pts = Points; +/- = Plus/minus; PIM = Penalty minutes

Goaltenders
Note: GP = Games played; TOI = Time on ice (minutes); W = Wins; L = Losses; OT = Overtime losses; GA = Goals against; SO = Shutouts; Sv% = Save percentage; GAA = Goals against average

Awards and records
King Clancy Memorial Trophy – Vincent Lecavalier
NHL Foundation Player Award – Vincent Lecavalier

Records

Milestones

Transactions
The Lightning have been involved in the following transactions during the 2007–08 season.

Trades

Free agents

Draft picks
Tampa's picks at the 2007 NHL Entry Draft in Columbus, Ohio.  The Lightning do not have a first round pick, having dealt the 16th overall selection to the Anaheim Ducks.

Farm teams

American Hockey League
Norfolk Admirals

ECHL
Mississippi Sea Wolves

See also
2007–08 NHL season

References

Player stats: Tampa Bay Lightning player stats on espn.com
Game log: Tampa Bay Lightning game log on espn.com
Team standings: NHL standings on espn.com

Tam
Tam
Tampa Bay Lightning seasons
Tamp
Tamp